The 2018–19 Kenyan Premier League is the 16th season of the Kenyan Premier League, the top-tier football league in Kenya, since it began in 2003, and the 56th season of top-division football in Kenya since 1963. The season started on 8 December 2018.

League table

Top scorers

Hat-tricks

References

Kenyan Premier League seasons
2018 in Kenyan football
2019 in Kenyan football
Kenya